Beşiktaş Men’s Volleyball is the men's volleyball section of Turkish sports club Beşiktaş J.K. in İstanbul, Turkey.

Honours
 Turkish Cup:
 Winners (1): 1983–84
 İstanbul Volleyball Championship:
 Winners (4): 1923–24, 1924–25, 1925–26, 1926–27
 Runners-up (5): 1927–28, 1928–29, 1929–30, 1930–31, 1932–33

Current squad
Squad as of May 29, 2017

External links
 Official Beşiktaş Volleyball Website 
 Turkish Volleyball Federastion official website

References

Beşiktaş Volleyball
Volleyball clubs established in 1986